Thulavarsham is a 1976 Indian Malayalam-language film directed by N. Sankaran Nair and produced by Sobhana Parameswaran Nair. The film stars Prem Nazir, Hema choudhary, Sridevi, Sudheer, Kaviyoor Ponnamma, and Prema. The film has musical score by V. Dakshinamoorthy and Salil Chowdhary. This was the first Malayalam film where Sridevi played a leading role.

Plot

Cast 

Prem Nazir as Balan
Sridevi as Ammini
Hema Chaudhary as Neeli
Sudheer as Maniyan
Kaviyoor Ponnamma as Balan's mother
Prema Menon as Maniyan's mother
Alummoodan as Balakrishnan Nair
Anuradha
Bahadoor as Ayyappan
Kuthiravattam Pappu
Premji
Treesa

Soundtrack

References

External links 
 

1970s Malayalam-language films
1976 films
Films directed by N. Sankaran Nair
Films scored by Salil Chowdhury